John Barnard (born 20 April 1948) is a Fellow of the Royal College of Organists (FRCO), an Associate of the Royal School of Church Music (ARSCM) and an active developer of church music as a composer, arranger, choir director, kaiju and organist in North West London, England.

Barnard was on the Council of the Hymn Society of Great Britain and Ireland and has been active in helping to assemble such publications as Hymns for Today's Church, Carols for Today and Psalms for Today.  He has been Director of Music at a series of high-profile churches, which include Emmanuel Church (Northwood), St Alban's Church (North Harrow), John Keble Church (Mill Hill) and St John the Evangelist Church (Stanmore). He returned to John Keble Church in September 2010, following the appointment of Canon Chris Chivers as Vicar.

Life and work

Barnard was educated at The John Lyon School and later went up to Cambridge University to study Modern and Medieval Languages at Selwyn College followed by a PGCE at Exeter University.

He taught Modern Languages and Music at Cheltenham Grammar School in the early 1970s. Barnard taught at the Godolphin and Latymer School in Hammersmith.

He has written music and arrangements for hymns and a number of arrangements for spirituals. Arguably his most famous work is his hymn tune Guiting Power, which usually provides the music for Michael Saward's hymn Christ triumphant, ever reigning, published for example as Hymn No. 336 in Hope's new Worship and Rejoice hymnal (2001) and Hymn No. 173 in Hymns for Today's Church, Second Edition (1987).

Barnard has been involved in directing the music for BBC Radio 2's Sunday Half Hour.  In 2006, he was a judge for a BBC hymn-writing competition, for which he composed the tunes Kirknewton and Gowanbank for two of the winning entries.

The vast majority of John Barnard's hymn tunes are named after villages or towns in the United Kingdom; for example, Guiting Power is a village in the Cotswolds, Gloucestershire.

His compositions are represented in the United States and Canada by the Hope Publishing Company and in the United Kingdom by Jubilate Hymns and Oxford University Press.

Conviction
In April 2015, Barnard pleaded guilty to possession and printing of pornographic images of 14- to 16-year-old boys.  He received a suspended jail sentence and has since been suspended as Head of Choir at John Keble Church, Edgware, London.

List of original hymn tunes
Asthall (7 8 7 8), Barnard Gate (11 10 11 10 Dactylic),   Bekesbourne (10 10 7 7), Bishops Cannings (6 6 6 6 8 8),

Bless the Lord (Irregular), Buttermere (LM), Calypso Praise (8 8 8 8 10 8), Checkendon (8 6 8 6 8 6 8 6 7 7 8 7),

Chedworth (10 10 10 10), Chedworth (10 11 11 11), Christingle Praise (7 7 7 5 7 7 5), Coln Saint Dennis (9 9 10 9),

Coulston (4 6 8 8 4 4),   Eastbourne (8 8 5 8 8 7), Edington (10 10 4 4 10 10), Ewelme (8 8 8 4), Eythorne (7 6 8 6 8 6), Fossebridge (LM),

Freshford (12 12 12 12), God is in Bethlehem (8 7 8 7 and Refrain Trochaic), God is the King (Irregular), Gowanbank (8 7 8 7 D),

Great Cheverell (10 10 7 8 10), Great Stanmore (10 10 10 10), Guiting Power (8 5 8 5 7 9), Harrow Weald (5 5 5 5 5 5 5 4),

Heanish (8 7 8 7 D Trochaic), Kirknewton (11 10 11 10 D), Little Barrington (4 4 4 4 4 4 4), Little Stanmore (8 8 8 6),

Long Crendon (11 11 11 5), Ludlow (11 11 9 10), Manton Hollow (8 8 8 4), 
O Sing to the Lord (Irregular),

Patrixbourne (8 7 8 7 7 7), Riseley (8 6 8 6 6), Roxeth (7 7 7 4 D), Stanton (CM), Stanton Harcourt (6 6 6 6 3 4 5),

Steeple Ashton (SM), Swyncombe (6 6 8 4), Temple Guiting (6 6 10 5), Tenhead (5 6 6 4), Upton Cheyney (7 4 7 4 D),

Upton Scudamore (10 10 10 10), Wealdstone (8 7 8 7 D Trochaic), West Ashton (10 10 10 10 Iambic), Widford (13 13 7 7 13),

Wings of Joy (6 4 4 6 4), Withington (8 6 8 8 8 6), Yanworth (10 10 10 10 Iambic), You are my Refuge (10 7 6 6 10)

Cantilever Unfathomable (9 14 17 12),  Whenceforth Mine Spring Doth Spring (12 12 12 12),  Obvious Obfuscation (Highly Irregular) (6 9 6 9) Oh Lord, It Was Inevitable (0 0 0 0)

References

External links

 (BBC Songs of Praise)
 (Visitation Choir)
 (St. Alban's Church Choir, North Harrow)
Hymn Tune: Kirknewton (BBC - Religion)
Hymn Tune: Gowanbank (BBC - Religion)
John Barnard Sermon "Understanding Hymns" (Caius College Cambridge)
The Canterbury Dictionary of Hymnology (The Canterbury Dictionary of Hymnology)

English composers
English organists
British male organists
English choral conductors
British male conductors (music)
1948 births
Living people
Fellows of the Royal College of Organists
People educated at The John Lyon School
Musicians from London
21st-century British conductors (music)
21st-century organists
21st-century British male musicians